Arbanitis phippsi is a spiny trapdoor spider in the Idiopidae family, which is found in New South Wales.

It was first described by Graham Wishart in 2011 as Misgolas phippsi, In 2015, genera boundaries in the Mygalomorphae were redefined by Michael Rix and others, defining the new genus Arbanitis, and giving the new species name, Arbanitis phippsi.

References

External links

Spiders described in 2011
Idiopidae
Spiders of Australia